Johnny Augustine (born July 7, 1993) is a professional Canadian football Running back for the Winnipeg Blue Bombers of the Canadian Football League (CFL).

College career
Augustine played college football at University of Guelph playing for the Guelph Gryphons.

Professional career
After very high expectations of being drafted early Augustine went undrafted in the 2017 CFL Draft he was signed by the Edmonton Eskimos but was released after a failed tryout for the team. Augustine was signed by the Saskatchewan Roughriders but was released prior to 2018 training camp.  He subsequently signed with Winnipeg.

Winnipeg Blue Bombers
On May 16, 2018, it was announced that Augustine was signed by the Winnipeg Blue Bombers. Augustine was a part of the 107th Grey Cup victory when the Blue Bombers defeated the Hamilton Tiger-Cats.

On December 27, 2019, it was announced that Augustine was signed to a two-year contract extension with the Blue Bombers.

Statistics

References

External links
Johnny Augustine CFL Bio
Johnny Augustine Guelph Bio
 

1993 births
Living people
Guelph Gryphons football players
Canadian football running backs
Players of Canadian football from Ontario
Sportspeople from Welland
Winnipeg Blue Bombers players